"No Matter What They Say" is a song by Lil' Kim from her second album The Notorious K.I.M. (2000). It was released as the lead single from the album on May 30, 2000 by Atlantic Records and Queen Bee Entertainment. 

A moderate commercial success, "No Matter What They Say" reached number 60 on the US Billboard Hot 100 and number 35 on the UK Singles Chart.

Background and composition
"No Matter What They Say" was not Kim's first choice as the lead single from the album. Kim did not want the song released as she felt the Spanish sound had already been done so many times due to the Latin pop explosion of the late 90s. Instead Kim wanted "The Queen", one of the songs that leaked prior to the album's release, as her first single. The record label didn't agree with Kim and insisted on releasing "No Matter What They Say". With time running out and not wanting her first week album sales to suffer, Kim agreed with her label to release the song. "The Queen" never made it on the album's final track listing. "Bad Girls" was another track that was leaked but Kim re-used the first verse for the lead single.

The song is a Latin and hip hop track with a latin rhythm based around the main sample of "Esto es el Guaguanco" by Cheo Feliciano. It has influences of tropical and East Coast hip hop. During the bridge, there's a breakdown chopping up the latin sample into a hip hop beat sampling multiple old-school hip hop songs such as "I Got It Made" by Special Ed, "I Know You Got Soul" by Eric B. & Rakim, and "Rapper's Delight" by The Sugarhill Gang.

The song also samples the line 'I'm just tryna be me, doing what I gotta do' from "Top of the World" by Brandy as well as "This is how it should be done" from Roxanne's On A Roll by Roxanne Shante.

Music video
The accompanying music video for "No Matter What They Say" was filmed in Los Angeles and directed by Marcus Raboy in early June 2000. It features cameo appearances from Puff Daddy, Mary J. Blige, Missy Elliott, Method Man & Redman, Xzibit, Junior M.A.F.I.A. and Carmen Electra. The video needed some digital retouches, such was "nipple fixes" for when Kim wiggles out of her Versace bustiers and computer-edited T-shirts for her backup girls (they were altered to "itty girls"). Cameo dancer Carmen Electra had her underwear altered as well. "It's not like you could really see anything. It's just the freeze-frame factor you have to consider", said director Marcus Raboy. The music video premiered on Total Request Live (TRL) on June 20, 2000.

Track listings

US Promo CD
"No Matter What They Say" (Radio Edit) - 4:19
"No Matter What They Say" (Album Version) - 5:35
"No Matter What They Say" (Instrumental) - 4:21

Europe CD single
"No Matter What They Say" (Radio Edit) - 4:18
"No Matter What They Say" (Album Version) - 4:14
"No Matter What They Say" (Instrumental) - 4:19
"No Matter What They Say" (Acappella) - 4:26

Credits and personnel
Credits for "No Matter What They Say" are taken from the single's liner notes.

Recording
Recorded at Daddy's House Recording Studios.
Recorded by Stephen Dent

Personnel
 Lil' Kim – lead vocals
 K. Jones, D. Henson, J. Feliciano, Eric B. & Rakim, E. Archer, R. Beavers, J. Hill, P. Jovner, D. Taylor, H. Thomas, N. Rodgers, B. Edwards – songwriting
 Darren "Limitless" Henson – producer
 Rich Travali – mixing
 Chris Athens – audio mastering

Charts

Weekly charts

Year-end charts

Release history

References

2000 singles
Lil' Kim songs
Music videos directed by Marcus Raboy
1999 songs
Atlantic Records singles
Songs written by Lil' Kim
Songs written by Bernard Edwards
Songs written by Nile Rodgers